Heidi Knapp Rinella is the former restaurant critic for the Las Vegas Review-Journal newspaper. She reviewed restaurants on Friday in Neon and her column, "Taste of the Town," appeared on Wednesdays in Living/Taste. She dined anonymously and paid for her own meals to ensure unbiased reviews.

Rinella has been a journalist for more than 25 years and is the recipient of a number of journalism awards, including three first-place awards for critical writing from the Nevada Press Association. She has worked for newspapers in Ohio, Florida, and Nevada and has published a number of Las Vegas and Nevada travel books.

The book The Stardust of Yesterday: Reflections on a Las Vegas Legend written by Rinella, edited by Mike Weatherford and foreword by Siegfried and Roy, is a complete history of the Stardust Resort and Casino. Rinella and Weatherford were both staff writers for the Las Vegas Review-Journal newspaper. In the book, Siegfried & Roy, who debuted at the Stardust in the 1970s, tell of their many memories.

Knapp retired from food writing in January 2022.

Personal
Heidi Knapp Rinella is not related to Las Vegas reporter George Knapp. She is, however, highly amused whenever she is asked if George Knapp is her father—which happens often.

References 

American restaurant critics
Living people
Year of birth missing (living people)